In geometry, the elongated triangular gyrobicupola is one of the Johnson solids . As the name suggests, it can be constructed by elongating a "triangular gyrobicupola," or cuboctahedron, by inserting a hexagonal prism between its two halves, which are congruent triangular cupolae. Rotating one of the cupolae through 60 degrees before the elongation yields the triangular orthobicupola.

Formulae
The following formulae for volume and surface area can be used if all faces are regular, with edge length a:

Related polyhedra and honeycombs

The elongated triangular gyrobicupola forms space-filling honeycombs with tetrahedra and square pyramids.

References

External links
 

Johnson solids